The LGBT community of Brighton and Hove is one of the largest in the United Kingdom. Brighton, a seaside resort on the south coast of England, is generally agreed to be the unofficial "gay capital" of the UK, with records pertaining to LGBT history dating back to the early 19th century.

Many LGBT pubs, clubs, bars, restaurants, cafés and shops are located around Brighton and in particular around St James's Street in Kemptown. Several LGBT charities, publishers, social and support groups are also based in the city. Brighton Pride is the largest Pride event in the UK, celebrated at the start of August and attracting as many as 450,000 people.

In a 2014 estimate, 11–15% of the city's population aged 16 or over is thought to be lesbian, gay or bisexual. The city also had the highest percentage of same-sex households in the UK in 2004 and the largest number of civil partnership registrations outside London in 2013.

History
Brighton has recorded LGBT history in the city since the 19th century. Many men were initially drawn to Brighton by the enormous numbers of soldiers garrisoned in the town during the Napoleonic Wars. Evidence suggests that a floating population and good transport links with London helped its reputation as a place for the LGBT community. By the 1930s, Brighton started to flourish as a gay destination and many gay and lesbian pubs started to establish themselves. During the Second World War, Brighton was filled with soldiers. Women and men in the forces who were away from home meeting other lesbians and gay people for the first time in their lives also heard about Brighton and its special pleasures and helped turn it into a gay destination in the post-war years.

Demographics
In a 2014 estimate, 11-15% of the city's population aged 16 or over is thought to be lesbian, gay or bisexual. The 2001 census revealed that Brighton and Hove had the highest proportion of same-sex households in the UK at 1.29%: 2,544 persons said that they lived with a person of the same sex. The 2011 census did not measure same-sex households specifically but showed that Brighton and Hove had the highest number of civil partnerships in the UK, at 2,346 individuals or 3.1% of all legal relationships within the unitary authority area. The city also had the largest number of civil partnership registrations outside London in 2013. The 2021 census showed that the largest percentage of LGBTQ+ reside in the area, where 20.11% of respondents said they was LGBO.

Events
Brighton Pride is an event, and wider organization, which promotes equality and diversity, and advances education to eliminate discrimination against the LGBT community. The major event is an annual summer festival held in the first week of August, which usually consists of a parade through the city centre, a festival event in Preston Park, the Pride Village Party and other club parties. Since 2013, it has also included an Arts and Film Festival and a Pride Dog Show.

The parade has attracted as many as 450,000 attendees and 50,000 people attend the park festival in 2018. The event brings 2% of the city's annual visitors in one day and in 2018 introduced an estimated £18 million to the city's economy. It is credited as one of the main ways Brighton has boosted its economy from tourism.

Trans Pride has taken place every July since 2013 with a parade and a weekend of events.

Eyes Wide Open is a queer film strand, regularly showcasing sexual and gender minorities on screens across the city.

Organisations
The Brighton & Hove LGBT Switchboard is a telephone helpline that describes itself as 'providing a service to the lesbian, gay, bisexual & trans communities since April 1975' and is one of the oldest in the UK.

The Clare Project is a local support group which provides a safe and confidential meeting place for anyone exploring issues around their gender identity, besides organising other events such as monthly meals.

MindOut is a mental health service run by and for LGBT people, based in Brighton and Hove.

The city also has the Allsorts Youth Project which aims to meet the needs of lesbian, gay, bisexual, trans and unsure youth in Brighton & Hove and the wider East Sussex area.

Both Brighton and Sussex universities have active LGBT organizations and they often work together to cater to the needs of LGBT students. Sussex LGBTQ is for students at the University of Sussex and LGBrighTon is for students at Brighton University.

The Brighton Ourstory Project was set up to collect and preserve lesbian and gay community history in the area.

In 2000 the large-scale LGBT community survey, Count Me In, led to the development of an LGBT Community Strategy 2001-06 for Brighton & Hove. Spectrum developed from this process to work with local services and planners in implementing the strategy and to provide infrastructure and community development support for the LGBT community. Its aim was to act as an independent voice, negotiating the rights of LGBT people locally with a specific focus on the needs of marginalised sections of the LGBT community. A second study, Count Me in Too!, published its 'Initial findings Reports' in 2007, in partnership between the University of Brighton and Spectrum. The second study aimed to identify gaps in the original research and update the strategy.

A free magazine is distributed in the city: Gscene, which describes itself as "the gay and lesbian lifestyle, listings and community magazine for Brighton and Hove".

Brighton has a gay and lesbian sports society called BLAGSS which offers a range of 17 sports or activities to its 600+ members. The city also has LGBTQ+  sports clubs such as  Brighton & Hove Sea Serpents RFC, a branch of the international Frontrunners : Brighton & Hove Frontrunners: Formed in 2018. Holding an annual rainbow run 5k the day before Brighton Pride and a branch of the LGBTQ+ aquatics Out to swim (Out to swim Brighton), plus many more.  There are also two congregations of the Metropolitan Community Church.

Historical Events
An early recording of the LGBT community in Brighton was in August 1822, when George Wilson, a servant from Newcastle upon Tyne, was accused by a guardsman he had met in the Duke of Wellington public house in Pool Valley of having offered him a sovereign and two shillings to go with him onto the beach to "commit an unnatural crime".

Another early story of the LGBT community in the area is that of philanthropist Angela Burdett-Coutts (1814-1906), a friend of both Charles Dickens and the Duke of Wellington, who spent part of each year at the Royal Albion Hotel with her companion Hannah. The couple were devoted to each other, socially recognised as a pair, and even sent joint Christmas cards. When Hannah died in 1878, Baroness Burdett-Coutts said she was utterly crushed by the loss of "my poor darling, the companion and sunshine of my life for 52 years".

A walking tour 'Piers & Queers' explores the historical sites and characters of LGBT interest.

See also
 Trans Pride Brighton

References

External links
 BLAGSS - Brighton Lesbian and Gay Sports Society
 MindOut - LGBT mental health project
 Clare Project - a self-supporting group open to anyone wishing to explore issues around gender identity
 Allsorts Youth Project
 Sussex University LGBTQ Society
 Count Me In Too!
  LGBT Church

Brighton and Hove
Gay villages in England